Hijack Stories is a 2000 South African crime film directed by Oliver Schmitz. It was screened in the Un Certain Regard section at the 2001 Cannes Film Festival.

Cast
 Tony Kgoroge as Sox Moraka
 Rapulana Seiphemo as Zama
 Percy Matsemela as Fly
 Makhaola Ndebele as Joe
 Moshidi Motshegwa as Grace
 Emily McArthur as Nicky
 Owen Sejake as Bra Dan
 Harold 'Speedy' Matihabo as Kenneth
 George Lamola as Steve
 Robert Whitehead as Casting Director
 Molemo Maarohanye as Bar youth
 Nimrod Nkosi as Bar youth
 Shane Maja as Bar youth
 Tumisho Masha as Bar youth
 Arthur Molepo as Brixton cop #1
 Carl Beukes as Brixton cop #2

References

External links

2000 films
2000 crime films
2000s English-language films
English-language South African films
Films directed by Oliver Schmitz
Films scored by Martin Todsharow
Films about hijackings
South African crime films